Christin Muche (born 19 October 1983) is a German female  track cyclist, and part of the national team. She competed at the 2005, 2007, 2008 and 2010 UCI Track Cycling World Championships. She won the bronze medal in the keirin event at the 2008 UCI Track Cycling World Championships.

References

External links
 
 

1983 births
Living people
German track cyclists
German female cyclists
Place of birth missing (living people)
Cyclists from North Rhine-Westphalia
Sportspeople from Aachen
20th-century German women
21st-century German women